Simich (Russian and Yaghnobi: Симич) is a village in Sughd Region, northwestern Tajikistan. It is part of the jamoat Anzob in the Ayni District. Its population was 0 in 2007.

References

Populated places in Sughd Region
Yaghnob